Waldemar Piątek (born 2 November 1979) is a Polish retired goalkeeper.

Club career 
He started his career in Wisłoka Dębica where he played until the spring season of 2001. Then, he moved to KSZO Ostrowiec Świętokrzyski, and in the spring of 2003 he was bought by Lech Poznań. In the season 2003/2004, while representing Lech, he won the Polish Cup and Polish Super Cup.

Piątek was highly regarded as a goalkeeper, before having his career cut short after being diagnosed with hepatitis C in mid-2005.

International career 
In July 2004 Piątek was called up to the Poland national football team for a friendly game in Chicago against the United States. However, he spent the entirety of the 1–1 draw on the bench.

Managerial career 
In 2021 and 2022 he served as a caretaker manager of Ekstraklasa side Bruk-Bet Termalica Nieciecza, following the Mariusz Lewandowski's lay-off and preceding the beginning of cooperation with Michał Probierz.

Honours

Club
Lech Poznań
 Polish Cup: 2003–04
 Polish Super Cup: 2004

References

1979 births
Living people
Polish footballers
KSZO Ostrowiec Świętokrzyski players
Lech Poznań players
Bruk-Bet Termalica Nieciecza managers
People from Dębica
Sportspeople from Podkarpackie Voivodeship
Association football goalkeepers